

T

 T2 (2009)
 T2 Trainspotting (2017)
 T-34 (2019)
 T-Force (1994)
 T-Men (1947)
 T-Rex: Back to the Cretaceous (1998)

Ta

 Ta chvíle, ten okamžik (1981)
 Ta Khar Ta Yan Nite A Chit The Ei Tho Phit Tat The (2004)
 Ta kitrina gantia (1960)
 Ta Kyawt Hna Kyawt Tay Ko Thi (1971)
 Ta Ra Rum Pum (2007)

Taa-Tam

 Taal (1999)
 Taan (2014)
 Taana (2020)
 Taaqat (1995)
 Taaqatwar (1989)
 Taare Zameen Par (2007)
 Taarkata (2014)
 Taarzan: The Wonder Car (2004)
 Taawdo the Sunlight (2017)
 Tab Hunter Confidential (2015)
 Tabaahi-The Destroyer (1999)
 Tabaluga (2018)
 Tabarana Kathe (1987)
 Tabarin (1958)
 Tabasco Road (1957)
 Tabataba (1988)
 Tabbaliyu Neenade Magane (1977)
 Tabi no Omosa (1972)
 Tabi wa Kimagure Kaze Makase (1958)
 The Table (1973)
 Table 19 (2017)
 Table No. 21 (2013)
 Tabloid (2010)
 Taboo: (1980, 1999 & 2002)
 Tabu (2012)
 Tabu, a Story of the South Seas (1931)
 Tackle Happy (2000)
 Tacones lejanos (1991)
 Tad, The Lost Explorer (2012)
 Tad's Swimming Hole (1918)
 Tada's Do-It-All House (2011)
 Tadakha (2013)
 Tadap (2021)
 Tadka (2021)
 Tadoussac (2017)
 Tadpole (2002)
 Tadpole and the Whale (1988)
 Taegukgi: The Brotherhood of War (2004)
 Taffy and the Jungle Hunter (1965)
 Tag: (2015 & 2018)
 Tag der Freiheit: Unsere Wehrmacht (1935)
 Taggart (1964)
 Tahader Katha (1992)
 Tahmina (1993)
 Tahrir 2011: The Good, the Bad, and the Politician (2011)
 Tahsildar Gari Ammayi (1971)
 Tai Chi 0 (2012)
 Tai Chi Boxer (1996)
 Tai Chi Hero (2012)
 Tai Chi Master (1993)
 Tai-Pan (1986)
 Taiga: (1958 & 1992)
 Taiikukan Baby (2008)
 Tail Gunner Joe (1977 TV)
 Tail Lights Fade (1999)
 Tail Spin (1939)
 Tail of a Tiger (1984)
 Tailcoat for Scapegrace (1979)
 The Tailor of Panama (2001)
 Tainá: An Adventure in the Amazon (2000)
 Tainá 2: A New Amazon Adventure (2004)
 Tainá 3: The Origin (2011)
 Tainted (1987)
 Tainted Money (1924)
 Taintlight (2009)
 Taivas tiellä (2000)
 Taiyō o Nusunda Otoko (1979)
 Taj Mahal: (1941, 1963, 1995, 1999, 2008 & 2015)
 Taj Mahal: An Eternal Love Story (2005)
 The Take: (1974, 2004 & 2007)
 Take All of Me (1976)
 Take Care (2014)
 Take the Lead (2006)
 Take Me Home: (1928 & 2011)
 Take Me Home Tonight (2011)
 Take Me Out to the Ball Game (1949)
 Take Me to the River: (2014 & 2015)
 Take the Money and Run (1969)
 Take Me (2017)
 Take My Eyes (2003)
 Take One False Step (1949)
 Take Out (2004)
 Take Shelter (2011)
 Take This Job and Shove It (1981)
 Take This Waltz (2011)
 Taken series:
 Taken (2008)
 Taken 2 (2012)
 Taken 3 (2014)
 Taken Away (1989)
 Takers (2010)
 Taking Care of Business (1990)
 Taking Chances (2009)
 The Taking of Deborah Logan (2014)
 Taking Father Home (2005)
 Taking Lives (2004)
 Taking Off (1971)
 The Taking of Pelham 123 (2009)
 The Taking of Pelham One Two Three: (1974 & 1998 TV)
 The Taking of Power by Louis XIV (1966 TV)
 Taking Sides (2002)
 Taking Tiger Mountain (1983)
 The Taking of Tiger Mountain (2014)
 Taking Tiger Mountain by Strategy (1970)
 Taking Woodstock (2009)
 Talea (2013)
 Tale About the Lost Time (1964)
 The Tale of Despereaux (2008)
 The Tale of the Fox (1937)
 A Tale of Love and Darkness (2015)
 Tale of the Mummy (1998)
 The Tale of the Priest and of His Workman Balda (1933-1936)
 The Tale of the Princess Kaguya (2013)
 Tale of the Rally (2014)
 A Tale of Springtime (1990)
 Tale of Tales: (1979 & 2015)
 The Tale of Tsar Saltan: (1966 & 1984)
 A Tale of Two Cities: (1911, 1922, 1935, 1958 & 1980 TV)
 A Tale of Two Critters (1977)
 A Tale of Two Kitties (1942)
 A Tale of Two Sisters: (1989 & 2003)
 A Tale of Winter (1992)
 The Tale of Zatoichi (1962)
 The Talented Mr. Ripley (1999)
 Tales From the Crypt (1972)
 Tales from the Dark 1 (2013)
 Tales from the Dark 2 (2013)
 Tales From the Darkside: The Movie (1990)
 Tales From Earthsea (2006)
 Tales from the Gimli Hospital (1988)
 The Tales of Hoffmann: (1923 & 1951)
 Tales from the Hood (1995)
 Tales from the Hood 2 (2018)
 Tales from the Hood 3 (2020)
 Tales of Manhattan (1942)
 Tales of Mystery (2015)
 Tales of Ordinary Madness (1981)
 Tales of Terror (1963)
 Tales That Witness Madness (1973)
 Talk (1994)
 Talk to Her (2002)
 Talk to Me (2007)
 Talk Radio (1988)
 Talk Straight: The World of Rural Queers (2003)
 The Talk of the Town (1942)
 Talkin' Dirty After Dark (1991)
 A Talking Picture (2003)
 The Tall Blond Man with One Black Shoe (1972)
 Tall Girl (2019)
 Tall Girl 2 (2022)
 The Tall Guy (1989)
 The Tall Man: (2011 & 2012)
 The Tall Men (1955)
 Tall in the Saddle (1944)
 The Tall T (1957)
 Tall Tale (1995)
 Talladega Nights: The Ballad of Ricky Bobby (2006)
 Los tallos amargos (1956)
 Tallulah (2016)
 Tam-Lin (1970)
 Tamala 2010: A Punk Cat in Space (2002)
 Tamara: (2005, 2016 French & 2016 Venezuelan)
 Tamara Drewe (2010)
 The Taming of the Shrew: (1908, 1929, 1942, 1962 TV, 1967 & 1973 TV)
 Tammy (2014)
 Tammy and the Bachelor (1957)
 Tammy and the T-Rex (1994)
 Tampopo (1985)

Tan-Taz

 Tanga - Deu no New York Times? (1987)
 Tangerine (2015)
 Tangerines (2013)
 Tangier: (1946 & 1982)
 Tangled: (2001 & 2010)
 Tango & Cash (1989)
 The Tango Lesson (1997)
 Tango, no me dejes nunca (1998)
 Tangra Blues (2021)
 Tanguy (2001)
 Tank Girl (1995)
 Tanner on Tanner (2004)
 The Tao of Steve (2000)
 Tap (1989)
 Tape (2001)
 Tapeheads (1988)
 Taps (1981)
 Tár (2022)
 Tara: (2001, 2010 & 2013)
 Tara Road (2005)
 Tarantula (1955)
 Taras Bulba (1962)
 Target: (1952, 1979, 1985, 2004, 2010 & 2014)
 Target Number One (2020)
 Targets (1968)
 Taris, roi de l'eau (1931)
 Tarka the Otter (1979)
 Tarnation (2003)
 Tart (2001)
 Tartarin de Tarascon (1908)
 Tartuffe: (1926 & 1965 TV)
 Tarzan: (1999 & 2013)
 Tarzan II (2005)
 Tarzan & Jane (2002)
 Tarzoon: Shame of the Jungle (1979)
 Tashan (2008)
 Task Force (1949)
 Taste the Blood of Dracula (1970)
 Taste of Cherry (1997)
 Taste of China (2015)
 A Taste of Honey (1961)
 The Taste of Others (2000)
 The Taste of Tea (2004)
 Tata Birla (1996)
 Tata Birla Madhyalo Laila (2006)
 Tatamma Kala (1974)
 Tatanka (2011)
 Tatar Ka Chor (1940)
 Tate's Voyage (1998)
 Tater Tot & Patton (2017)
 Tati (1973)
 Tatie Danielle (1990)
 Tatjana (1923)
 Tatsu (1994)
 Tatsumi (2011)
 Tattooed Life (1965)
 Tatu (2017)
 Tatuagem (2013)
 Tatyana's Day (1967)
 Tau (2015)
 Tauba Tauba (2004)
 Tauba Tera Jalwa (TBD)
 Taur Mittran Di (2012)
 Taurus (2001)
 Taw Kyi Kan (2017)
 Tawaif (1985)
 Tawny Pipit (1944)
 Tax Collector (1997)
 The Tax Collector (2020)
 Taxa K 1640 efterlyses (1956)
 Taxandria (1994)
 Taxi: (1953, 1996, 2004 & 2015)
 Taxi series:
 Taxi (1998)
 Taxi 2 (2000)
 Taxi 3 (2003)
 Taxi 4 (2007)
 Taxi 5 (2018)
 Taxi! (1932)
 Taxi! Taxi!: (1927 & 2013)
 Taxi!!! (1978 TV)
 Taxi 13 (1928)
 Taxi Ballad (2011)
 Taxi Beirut (2011)
 Taxi Blues (1990)
 Taxi Car (1972)
 Taxi Chor (1980)
 Taxi to the Dark Side (2007)
 Taxi Driver: (1954, 1976, 1977 & 1978)
 Taxi Driver: Oko Ashewo (2015)
 Taxi Girl (1977)
 Taxi to Heaven (1943)
 Taxi nach Kairo (1987)
 Taxi zum Klo (1981)
 Taxi Lovers (2005)
 Taxi at Midnight (1929)
 Taxi, Mister (1943)
 Taxi No. 9211 (2006)
 Taxi to Paradise (1933)
 Taxi Ramudu (1961)
 Taxi, Roulotte et Corrida (1958)
 Taxi for Two (1929)
 Taxi-Kitty (1950)
 Taxidermia (2006)
 A Taxing Woman (1987)
 Taxman (1999)
 Tayaramma Bangarayya (1979)
 Taylor's Wall (2001)
 Tazza: One Eyed Jack (2019)
 Tazza: The Hidden Card (2014)
 Tazza: The High Rollers (2006)

Tc

 TC 2000 (1993)
 Tchaikovsky (1970)
 Tchaikovsky's Wife (2022)
 Tchin-Chao, the Chinese Conjurer (1904)

Te

Tea-Tem

 Tea with the Dames (2018)
 Tea in the Harem (1985)
 Tea Kadai Raja (2016)
 Tea Leaves in the Wind (1938)
 Tea with Mussolini (1999)
 Tea and Sympathy (1956)
 Tea for Three (1927)
 Tea Time in the Ackerstrasse (1926)
 Tea for Two (1950)
 Tea for Two Hundred (1948)
 Teacher of the Year: (2014 & 2019)
 Teacher's Beau (1935)
 Teacher's Pests (1932)
 Teacher's Pet: (1930, 1958 & 2004)
 Teacheramma (1968)
 Teachers (1984)
 Teaching Mrs. Tingle (1999)
 The Teahouse of the August Moon (1956)
 Team America: World Police (2004)
 Team Batista no Eikō (2008)
 Team Foxcatcher (2016)
 Team Spirit (2016)
 Teamster Boss: The Jackie Presser Story (1992 TV)
 Tear This Heart Out (2008)
 Tearin' Into Trouble (1927)
 Tearing Through (1925)
 Tears (2000) 
 Tears of the Black Tiger (2000)
 Tears in the Fabric (2014)
 Tears for Sale (2008)
 Tears and Smiles (1917)
 Tears of the Sun (2003)
 Tears Were Falling (1982)
 Ted (2012)
 Ted 2 (2015)
 Ted Bundy (2002)
 Ted Bundy: American Boogeyman (2021)
 Teen Beach Movie (2013)
 Teen Beach 2 (2015)
 Teen Kanya (1961)
Teen Titans movies:
 Teen Titans: Trouble in Tokyo (2006 TV)
 Teen Titans: The Judas Contract (2017)
 Teen Titans Go! to the Movies (2018)
 Teen Witch (1989)
 Teen Wolf (1985)
 Teen Wolf Too (1987)
 Teenage (2013)
 Teenage Caveman: (1958 & 2002)
 Teenage Exorcist (1994)
 Teenage Mutant Ninja Turtles series:
 Teenage Mutant Ninja Turtles: (1990 & 2014)
 Teenage Mutant Ninja Turtles II: The Secret of the Ooze (1991)
 Teenage Mutant Ninja Turtles III (1993)
 Teenage Mutant Ninja Turtles: Out of the Shadows (2016)
 Teenage Zombies (1959)
 Teenagers from Outer Space (1959)
 Tees Maar Khan (2010)
 Teeth (2008)
 Teheran 43 (1981)
 Tekken: (1990 & 2009)
 Tekken 2: Kazuya's Revenge (2014)
 Tekken: Blood Vengeance (2011)
 Tel Aviv on Fire (2018)
 Telefon (1977)
 Tell Me Something (1999)
 Tell Me Who I Am (2019)
 Tell No One (2006)
 Tell Them Willie Boy Is Here (1969)
 The Tell-Tale Heart: (1934, 1941, 1953 American, 1953 British, 1960, 1961 TV & 2014)
 The Tell-Tale Message (1912)
 The Telling (2009)
 Telokhranitel (1979)
 Temmink: The Ultimate Fight (1998)
 Temno (1950)
 The Temp (1993)
 Temper (2015)
 The Tempest: (1908, 1911, 1960 TV, 1963, 1979 & 2010)
 Tempest: (1928, 1958, 1982 & 2015)
 Temple (2017)
 Temporada de patos (2004)
 Temporary Family (2014)
 Le Temps qui reste (2006)
 Temptation: (1915, 1923, 1929, 1934, 1935, 1946, 1959 & 2007)
 The Temptation of St. Tony (2009)
 Temptation: Confessions of a Marriage Counselor (2013)
 The Temptations (1998 TV)
 Tempting Heart (1999)
 The Temptress (1926)
 Temptress Moon (1996)

Ten-Teq

 The Ten (2008)
 Ten 'til Noon (2007)
 Ten Canoes (2006)
 The Ten Commandments: (1923 & 1956)
 Ten Little Indians (1965)
 Ten Minutes to Live (1932)
 Ten Minutes Older (2002)
 Ten Nights in a Bar Room: (1910 & 1921)
 Ten Nights in a Bar-Room (1931)
 Ten Nights in a Barroom (1926)
 Ten North Frederick (1958)
 Ten Seconds to Hell (1959)
 Ten Zan: The Ultimate Mission (1988)
 Tenacious D in The Pick of Destiny (2006)
 The Tenant (1976)
 Tender (2020)
 The Tender Bar (2021)
 Tender Fictions (1996)
 Tenderloin (1928)
 Tender Mercies (1983)
 Tender Is the Night (1962)
 Tenderness: (2009 & 2017)
 The Tenderness of Wolves (1973)
 Tenebrae (1982)
 Tenement (1985)
 Tenet (2020)
 Tengoku no honya (2004)
 Tennessee's Partner (1955)
 Tenshi ni I'm Fine (2016)
 Tension (1950)
 Tentacles (1977)
 Tenure (2009)
 Teorema (1968)
 Tepee for Two (1963)
 Tequila Sunrise (1988)

Ter

 Tera Intezaar (2017)
 Tera Jadoo Chal Gayaa (2000)
 Tera Kya Hoga Johnny (2008)
 Tera Mera Ki Rishta (2009)
 Tera Mera Saath Rahen (2001)
 Tera Mera Tedha Medha (2015)
 Tera Mera Vaada (2012)
 Tera Naam Mera Naam (1988)
 Teraa Surroor (2016)
 Tere Pyar Mein (2000)
 Tere Bin Laden (2010)
 Tere Bin Laden: Dead or Alive (2016)
 Tere Bina Jiya Nahin Jaye (unreleased)
 Tere Ghar Ke Samne (1963)
 Tere Jism Se Jaan Tak (2015)
 Tere Mere Phere (2011)
 Tere Mere Sapne: (1971 & 1996)
 Tere Naal Love Ho Gaya (2012)
 Tere Naam (2003)
 Tere Pyar Mein: (1979 & 2000)
 Teree Sang (2009)
 Teresa: (1951, 1987 & 2010)
 Teresa the Thief (1973)
 Teresa's Tattoo (1994)
 Teri Baahon Mein (1984)
 Teri Bhabhi Hai Pagle (2018)
 Teri Kasam (1982)
 Teri Meherbaniyan (1985)
 Teri Meri Ik Jindri (1975)
 Teri Meri Kahaani (2012)
 Teri Meri Love Story (2016)
 Teri Payal Mere Geet (1993)
 Term Life (2016)
 Terminal (2018)
 The Terminal (2004)
 Terminal Bar (2003)
 Terminal Bliss (1992)
 Terminal Entry (1987)
 Terminal Error (2002)
 Terminal Exposure (1987)
 Terminal Invasion (2002)
 Terminal Island (1973)
 Terminal Station (1953)
 Terminal Velocity (1994)
 Terminal Virus (1995)
 Terminal Voyage (1994)
 Terminator series:
 The Terminator (1984)
 Terminator 2: Judgment Day (1991)
 Terminator 3: Rise of the Machines (2003)
 Terminator Salvation (2009)
 Terminator Genisys (2015)
 Terminator: Dark Fate (2019)
 Termini Station (1989)
 Terms of Endearment (1983)
 La Terra Trema (1957)
 A Terra-Cotta Warrior (1990)
 Terrace House: Closing Door (2015)
 A Terrible Beauty (1960)
 A Terrible Night (1896)
 Terrified (2017)
 Terrifier (2016)
 Terrifier 2 (2022)
 The Terror: (1917, 1920, 1926, 1928, 1938 & 1963)
 Terror in the Aisles (1984)
 Terror in the Crypt (1964)
 Terror Firmer (1999)
 Terror of Mechagodzilla (1975)
 Terror by Night (1946)
 Terror at Tenkiller (1986)
 Terror Tract (2000)
 Terror Train (1980)
 The Terror Within (1989)
 The Terror Within II (1991)
 The Terror with Women (1956)
 Terrorama! (2001)
 The Terrorist (1998)
 Terrorists, Killers and Middle-East Wackos (2005)
 TerrorVision (1986)

Tes-Tez

 Tesis (1996)
 Tesis sobre un homicidio (2013)
 Tesla: (2016 TV & 2020)
 Tess: (1979 & 2016)
 Tess of the d'Urbervilles: (1913 & 1924)
 Tess of the Storm Country: (1914, 1922, 1932 & 1960)
 The Tesseract (2003)
 Test: (2013 & 2014)
 Test Pack (2012)
 Test Pattern (2019)
 Test Pilot (1938)
 Test Pilot Donald (1951)
 Test Tube Babies (1948)
 Testament: (1983 & 2004)
 The Testament of Dr. Mabuse (1933)
 Testament of Orpheus (1959)
 Testament of Youth (2014)
 Testimony: (1920 & 1988)
 The Testimony: (1946 & 2015)
 Testosterone: (2003, 2004 & 2007)
 Tests for Real Men (1998)
 Tetsujin 28: The Movie (2005)
 Tetsujin Nijūhachi-gō: Hakuchū no Zangetsu (2007)
 Tetsuo series:
 Tetsuo: The Iron Man (1988)
 Tetsuo II: Body Hammer (1992)
 Tetsuo: The Bullet Man (2009)
 Tevar (2015)
 Tevya (1939)
 Tex (1982)
 Tex and the Lord of the Deep (1985)
 Tex Rides with the Boy Scouts (1937)
 Texans Never Cry (1951)
 Texas: (1941 & 2005)
 Texas Across the River (1966)
 Texas, Adios (1966)
 Texas Bad Man (1953)
 Texas to Bataan (1942)
 Texas, Brooklyn & Heaven (1948)
 Texas Buddies (1932)
 Texas Carnival (1951)
 The Texas Chainsaw Massacre series:
 The Texas Chain Saw Massacre (1974)
 The Texas Chainsaw Massacre 2 (1986)
 Leatherface: The Texas Chainsaw Massacre III (1990)
 Texas Chainsaw Massacre: The Next Generation (1995)
 The Texas Chainsaw Massacre (2003)
 The Texas Chainsaw Massacre: The Beginning (2006)
 Texas Chainsaw 3D (2013)
 Leatherface (2017)
 Texas Chainsaw Massacre (2022)
 Texas City (1952)
 Texas Cyclone (1932)
 Texas Dynamo (1950)
 Texas Gun Fighter (1932)
 Texas Jack (1935)
 Texas Killing Fields (2011)
 Texas Lady (1955)
 Texas Lawmen (1951)
 Texas Lightning (1981)
 Texas Manhunt (1949)
 Texas Masquerade (1944)
 Texas Panhandle (1945)
 Texas Pioneers (1932)
 Texas Rangers (2001)
 The Texas Rangers (1936)
 Texas Rangers Ride Again (1940)
 Texas Renegades (1940)
 Texas Terror (1935)
 Texas Terrors (1940)
 Texas Tommy (1928)
 Texas Trail (1937)
 Texasville (1990)
 Text (2019)
 Text Book (2010)
 Textiles (2004)
 Teyzem (1986)
 Teza (2008)
 Tezaab (1988)

Th

Tha

 Tha (2010)
 Thaai (1974)
 Thaai Magalukku Kattiya Thaali (1959)
 Thaai Manasu (1994)
 Thaai Mookaambikai (1982)
 Thaai Naadu (1989)
 Thaai Nadu (1947)
 Thaai Sollai Thattadhe (1961)
 Thaaiku Oru Thaalaattu (1986)
 Thaala (2019)
 Thaalam Manasinte Thaalam (1981)
 Thaalam Thettiya Tharattu (1983)
 Thaalappoli (1977)
 Thaali (1997)
 Thaali Bhagyam (1966)
 Thaali Kattiya Raasa (1992)
 Thaali Pudhusu (1997)
 Thaalikaatha Kaaliamman (2001)
 Thaamarathoni (1975)
 Thaamirabharani (2007)
 Thaanaa Serndha Koottam (2018)
 Thaandavam (2012)
 Thaaraavu (1981)
 Thaaye Unakkaga (1966)
 Thaayi Saheba (1997)
 Thaayillamal Naan Illai (1979)
 Thaayin Madiyil (1964)
 Thampu (1978)
 Thank God It's Friday (1978)
 Thank You for Smoking (2006)
 Thank You for Your Service: (2015 & 2017)
 Thanks for the Memory (1938)
 Thanks for Sharing (2012)
 ThanksKilling (2008)
 That Brennan Girl (1946)
 That Certain Woman (1937)
 That Cold Day in the Park (1969)
 That Darn Cat: (1965 & 1997)
 That Evening Sun (2009)
 That Girl in Yellow Boots (2010)
 That Hamilton Woman (1941)
 That Man Bolt (1973)
 That Man from Rio (1964)
 That Midnight Kiss (1949)
 That Most Important Thing: Love (1975)
 That Night in Varennes (1982)
 That Obscure Object of Desire (1977)
 That Old Feeling (1997)
 That Thing You Do! (1996)
 That Touch of Mink (1962)
 That Uncertain Feeling (1941)
 That's Carry On! (1977)
 That's Entertainment! series:
 That's Dancing! (1985)
 That's Entertainment! (1974)
 That's Entertainment, Part II (1976)
 That's Entertainment! III (1994)
 That's Life! (1986)
 That's My Boy: (1932, 1951 & 2012)
 That's My Wife: (1929 & 1933)
 The Thaw (2010)
 Thayagam (1996)
 Thayai Katha Thanayan (1962)
 Thayamma (1991)
 Thaye Neeye Thunai (1987)
 Thayi Devaru (1971)
 Thayi Illada Thabbali (2003)
 Thayi Karulu (1962)
 Thazhampoo (1965)
 Thazhuvatha Kaigal (1986)
 Thazhvaram (1990)

The

 The Theatre Bizarre (2011)
 Theatre of Blood (1973)
 Thee: (1981 & 2009)
 Theeb (2014)
 Theekkadal (1980)
 Their Own Desire (1930)
 Their Purple Moment (1928)
 Theirs is the Glory (1946)
 Thelma & Louise (1991)
 Them (2006)
 Them Thar Hills (1934)
 Them! (1954)
 Themroc (1942)
 Then Came You (2018)
 Then She Found Me (2008)
 Theodora Goes Wild (1936)
 Theodore Case Sound Test: Gus Visser and His Singing Duck (1925)
 Theodore Rex (1995)
 Theorem (1968)
 The Theory of Everything: (2006 TV & 2014)
 The Theory of Flight (1998)
 There Are No Saints (2022)
 There Be Dragons (2011)
 There Is No Evil (2020)
 There is a Secret in my Soup (2001)
 There Was a Crooked Man (1960)
 There Was a Crooked Man... (1970)
 There Was a Father (1942)
 There Will Be Blood (2007)
 There Will Be No Leave Today (1959)
 There's Always Vanilla (1971)
 There's a Girl in My Soup (1970)
 There's No Business Like Show Business (1954)
 There's No Place Like This Place, Anyplace (2020)
 There's Someone Inside Your House (2021)
 There's Something About Mary (1998)
 There's Something About a Soldier: (1934 & 1943)
 There's Something About Susan (2013 TV)
 There's Something in the Water (2019)
 There's Something Wrong with Aunt Diane (2011 TV)
 Theremin: An Electronic Odyssey (1993)
 Theresienstadt (1944)
 These Are the Damned (1963)
 These Thousand Hills (1959)
 These Three (1936)
 They: (1993 TV, 2002 & 2017)
 They All Laughed (1981)
 They Call Me Bruce? (1982)
 They Call Me Mister Tibbs! (1970)
 They Call Me Trinity (1970)
 They Came Back (2004)
 They Came to Cordura (1959)
 They Came to Rob Las Vegas (1968)
 They Came Together (2014)
 They Died with Their Boots On (1941)
 They Don't Wear Black Tie (1981)
 They Drive by Night (1940)
 They Go Boom (1929)
 They Knew What They Wanted (1940)
 They Live (1988)
 They Live by Night (1949)
 They Look Like People (2015)
 They Might Be Giants (1971)
 They Saved Hitler's Brain (1968)
 They Shall Not Grow Old (2018)
 They Shoot Horses, Don't They? (1969)
 They Still Call Me Bruce (1987)
 They Went That-A-Way & That-A-Way (1978)
 They Were Expendable (1945)
 They're Outside (2020)
 They're a Weird Mob (1966)

Thi

 Thick as Thieves (2009)
 Thicker than Water: (1935, 1999, 2000, 2005 & 2006)
 Thief (1981)
 The Thief: (1952 & 1997)
 The Thief of Baghdad: (1924, 1940 & 1961)
 A Thief Catcher (1914)
 The Thief and the Cobbler (1993)
 The Thief Lord (2006)
 The Thief Who Came to Dinner (1973)
 Thieves Like Us (1974)
 Thieves' Highway (1949)
 The Thin Blue Line (1988)
 Thin Ice: (1919, 1937, 2011 & 2013)
A Thin Line Between Love and Hate (1996)
 The Thin Man (1934)
 The Thin Man Goes Home (1945)
 The Thin Red Line: (1964 & 1998)
 The Thing: (1982 & 2011)
 The Thing About My Folks (2005)
 The Thing from Another World (1951)
 The Thing with Two Heads (1972)
 Things (1989)
 Things Are Tough All Over (1982)
 Things Behind the Sun (2001)
 Things Change (1988)
 Things to Come (1936)
 Things to Do in Denver When You're Dead (1995)
 Things Heard & Seen (2021)
 Things We Lost in the Fire (2007)
 Things You Can Tell Just by Looking at Her (2000)
 Think like a Man (2012)
 Thinner (1996)
 The Thinning (2016)
 The Third Generation: (1979 & 2009)
 The Third Lover (1962)
 The Third Man (1949)
 The Third Miracle (2000)
 The Third Part of the Night (1971)
 The Third Party (2016)
 The Third Wheel (2002)
 The Third Wife (2018)
 Thirst (2009)
 Thirteen (2003)
 The Thirteen Chairs (1969)
 Thirteen Conversations About One Thing (2001)
 Thirteen Days (2000)
 Thirteen Ghosts: (1960 & 2001)
 Thirteen Lives (2022)
 Thirteen Princess Trees (2006)
 Thirteen Women (1932)
 The Thirteenth Floor (1999)
 The Thirteenth Hour: (1927 & 1947)
 The Thirteenth Warrior (1999)
 The Thirteenth Year (1999) (TV)
 The Thirty Nine Steps (1978)
 Thirty Seconds Over Tokyo (1944)
 This Angry Age (1957)
 This Is 40 (2012)
 This Is the Army (1943)
 This Boy's Life (1993)
 This Christmas (2007)
 This Is Cinerama (1952)
 This Is the End (2013)
 This Is England (2006)
 This Film Is Not Yet Rated (2006)
 This Girl's Life (2003)
 This Gun for Hire (1942)
 This Is Happening (2015)
 This Happy Breed (1944)
 This Happy Feeling (1959)
 This Island Earth (1955)
 This Land Is Mine (1943)
 This Man Must Die (1969)
 This Is Martin Bonner (2013)
 This Is Me (2015)
 This Means War (2012)
 This Must Be the Place (2011)
 This Is My Father (1999)
 This Is the Night: (1932 & 2021)
 This Is Not a Film (2011)
 This Is Not a Love Song (2003)
 This Is Not a Test: (1962 & 2008)
 This Property Is Condemned (1966)
 This Is Spinal Tap (1984)
 This Sporting Life (1963)
 This Is Where I Leave You (2014)

Tho

 Thoda Lutf Thoda Ishq (2015)
 Thoda Pyaar Thoda Magic (2008)
 Thoda Tum Badlo Thoda Hum (2004)
 Thodakkam (2008)
 Thodallullu (1988)
 Thodari (2016)
 Thodarum (1999)
 Thodasa Roomani Ho Jayen (1990)
 Thodi Kodallu (1957)
 Thodi Life Thoda Magic (2008)
 Thodi Thodi Si Manmaaniyan (2017)
 Thodisi Bewafaii (1980)
 Thodraa (2018)
 Thodu Dangalu (1954)
 Thodu Needa (1965)
 Thoicha (2010)
 Thokkukal Kadha Parayunnu (1968)
 Tholaipesi (2007)
 Tholi Kodi Koosindi (1981)
 Tholi Muddhu (1993)
 Tholi Prema: (1998 & 2018)
 Tholi Valapu (2001)
 Tholireyi Gadichindi (1977)
 Tholkan Enikku Manassilla (1977)
 Tholu Bommalata (2019)
 The Thomas Crown Affair: (1968 & 1999)
 Thomas Jefferson (1997)
 Thomas and the Magic Railroad (2000)
 Thondan: (1995 & 2017)
 Thondimuthalum Driksakshiyum (2017)
 Thong Dee Fun Khao (2017)
 Thoogudeepa (1966)
 Thookku Thookki (1954)
 Thooku Medai (1982)
 Thoondil (2008)
 Thoonga Nagaram (2011)
 Thoongaa Vanam (2015)
 Thoongathey Thambi Thoongathey (1983)
 Thooral Ninnu Pochchu (1982)
 Thoorpu Padamara (1976)
 Thoothukudi (2006)
 Thooval Kottaram (1996)
 Thoovalkattu (2010)
 Thoovalsparsham (1990)
 Thoovanam (2007)
 Thoovanathumbikal (1987)
 Thoppil Joppan (2016)
 Thoppul Kodi (2011)
 Thor movies:
 Thor (2011)
 Thor: Tales of Asgard (2011)
 Thor: The Dark World (2013)
 Thor: Ragnarok (2017)
 Thor: Love and Thunder (2022)
 Thor and the Amazon Women (1963)
 Thor the Conqueror (1983)
 Thora Jee Le (2017)
 Thoranai (2009)
 Thoranam (1987)
 The Thorn (1974)
 Thoroughbred (1936)
 The Thoroughbred: (1916 & 1928)
 Thoroughbreds: (1944 & 2017)
 Thoroughbreds Don't Cry (1937)
 Thoroughly Modern Millie (1967)
 Those Awful Hats (1909)
 Those Blasted Kids (1947)
 Those Boys! (1909)
 Those Calloways (1965)
 Those Country Kids (1914)
 Those Dear Departed (1987)
 Those Dirty Dogs (1973)
 Those Endearing Young Charms (1945)
 Those Glory Glory Days (1983 TV)
 Those Happy Days: (1914 & 2006)
 Those Happy Years (2013)
 Those High Grey Walls (1939)
 Those Kids from Town (1942)
 Those Lips, Those Eyes (1980)
 Those Love Pangs (1914)
 Those Magnificent Men in their Flying Machines (1965)
 Those Merry Souls (1985)
 Those Old Love Letters (1992)
 Those People (2015)
 Those People Next Door (1953)
 Those Redheads from Seattle (1953)
 Those Were the Days: (1996, 1997, & 2000)
 Those Were Wonderful Days (1934)
 Thou Shalt Honor Thy Wife (1925)
 Thou Wast Mild and Lovely (2014)
 Those She Left Behind (1989 TV)
 Those Terrible Twins (1925)
 Those Three French Girls (1930)
 Those Two (1935)
 Those We Love (1932)
 Those Were Wonderful Days (1934)
 Those Who Dance: (1924 & 1930)
 Those Who Dare (1924)
 Those Who Judge (1924)
 Those Who Love: (1926 & 1929)
 Those Who Love Me Can Take the Train (1998)
 Those Who Remain (2007)
 Those Who Remained (2019)
 Those Who Walk Away (2022)
 Those Who Wish Me Dead (2021)
 Thoughtcrimes (2003)
 A Thousand Acres (1997)
 A Thousand Billion Dollars (1982)
 A Thousand Clouds of Peace (2003)
 A Thousand Clowns (1965)
 The Thousand Eyes of Dr. Mabuse (1960)
 A Thousand Words (2012)
 Thousands Cheer (1943)

Thr

 Threads: (1984 TV & 2017)
 Three: (1965, 1969, 2002, 2006, 2008, 2010 & 2016)
 Three Ages (1923)
 Three Amigos (1986)
 Three Billboards Outside Ebbing, Missouri  (2017)
 Three Blind Mice: (1938, 2003 & 2008)
 Three Body (2016)
 The Three Burials of Melquiades Estrada (2005)
 Three Businessmen (1998)
 The Three Caballeros (1944)
 Three Christs (2017)
 Three Coins in the Fountain (1954)
 Three Colors series:
 Three Colors: Blue (1993)
 Three Colors: White (1994)
 Three Colors: Red (1994)
 Three Comrades: (1935 & 1938)
 Three on a Couch (1966)
 Three Crowns of the Sailor (1983)
 Three Daughters (1961)
 Three Days in August (2016)
 Three Days of the Condor (1975)
 Three Dollars (2005)
 Three Faces East: (1926 & 1930)
 The Three Faces of Eve (1957)
 Three Fugitives (1989)
 Three Godfathers (1936)
 The Three Godfathers (1916)
 Three the Hard Way (1974)
 Three Identical Strangers (2018)
 Three Kings: (1999 & 2011)
 Three Little Pigs (1933)
 Three Little Words (1950)
 The Three Lives of Thomasina (1963)
 The Three Marias (2002)
 Three on a Match (1932)
 Three Men and a Baby (1987)
 Three Men in a Boat: (1920, 1933, 1956, 1961, 1975 TV & 1979)
 Three Men on a Horse (1936)
 Three Men to Kill (1980)
 Three Men and a Little Lady (1990)
 Three Men in the Snow: (1936, 1955 & 1974)
 The Three Million Trial (1926)
 Three Modern Women (1932)
 Three Monkeys (2008)
 Three Mothers (2006)
 The Three Musketeers: (1921, 1933 serial, 1973, 1992, 1993 & 2013)
 The Three Musketeers: D'Artagnan (2023)
 The Three Musketeers: Milady (2023)
 Three O'Clock High (1987)
 Three Outlaw Samurai (1964)
 Three from Prostokvashino (1978)
 Three Reservists (1971)
 Three for the Road (1987)
 Three Seasons (1999)
 Three Sisters: (1970, 1994 & 2012)
 The Three Sisters: (1930, 1966 & 1970 TV)
 Three Smart Girls (1936)
 The Three Smiles (1969)
 Three Songs About Lenin (1934)
 Three Steps to the Gallows (1953)
 The Three Stooges series:
 The Three Stooges Meet Hercules (1962)
 The Three Stooges in Orbit (1962)
 The Three Stooges Go Around the World in a Daze (1963)
 The Three Stooges (2000)
 The Three Stooges (2012)
 Three Stories of Love (2015)
 Three to Tango (1999)
 Three Thousand Years of Longing (2022)
 Three Times (2005)
 Three Tough Guys (1974)
 Three Wise Fools: (1923 & 1946)
 Three Wise Men: (2008 & 2016)
 Three Wishes for Cinderella (1973)
 Three Women: (1924, 1949 & 1952)
 Three Young Texans (1954)
 Three... Extremes (2004)
 The Threepenny Opera (1931)
 Threesome: (1994 & 2017)
 The Thrill of It All (1963)
 The Thrill Killers (1964)
 Thrill of a Lifetime (1937)
 Thrill Ride (2017)
 Thriller – A Cruel Picture (1973)
 Throne of Blood (1957)
 Throne of Elves (2016)
 Through Black Spruce (2018)
 Through the Fire: (1982, 2005 & 2018)
 Through a Glass Darkly (1961)
 Through the Looking Glass (1976)
 Through the Night (2020)
 Through the Olive Trees (1994)
 Throw Down (2004)
 Throw Momma from the Train (1987)
 Throwback (2014)
 Thru the Mirror (1936)

Thu-Thy

 Thudakkam (2004)
 Thudar Katha (1991)
 Thudikkum Karangal (1983)
 Thug Life (2001)
 Thugs with Dirty Mugs (1939)
 Thugs of Hindostan (2018)
 Thukkaram (1938)
 Thulabharam (1968)
 Thulasi: (1976 & 1987)
 Thulasi Jalandar (1947)
 Thulasi Maadam (1963)
 Thulavarsham (1976)
 Thuli Visham (1954)
 Thulladha Manamum Thullum (1999)
 Thullal (2007)
 Thulli Thirintha Kaalam (1998)
 Thulli Vilayadu (2013)
 Thullum Kaalam (2005)
 Thullura Vayasu (2006)
 Thulluvadho Ilamai (2002)
 Thumb Fun (1952)
 Thumb Tripping (1972)
 Thumbaa (2019)
 Thumbelina (1994)
 Thumbida Koda (1964)
 Thumbida Mane (1995)
 Thumbolarcha (1974)
 Thumboli Kadappuram (1995)
 Thumbs Down (1927)
 Thumbs Up (1943)
 Thumbsucker (2005)
 Thumper (2017)
 Thun Man Handiya (1970)
 Thunai (1982)
 Thunai Mudhalvar (2015)
 Thunaivan (1969)
 Thundenek (TBD)
 Thunder (1929)
 Thunder Afloat (1939)
 Thunder Alley: (1967 & 1985)
 Thunder Among the Leaves (1958)
 Thunder of Battle (1964)
 Thunder Bay (1953)
 Thunder Below (1932)
 Thunder Birds (1942)
 Thunder in Carolina (1960)
 Thunder in the City (1937)
 Thunder in the Desert (1938)
 Thunder in the East: (1950 & 1951)
 Thunder Force (2021)
 Thunder in God's Country (1951)
 Thunder in Guyana (2003)
 Thunder on the Hill (1951)
 Thunder Island (1963)
 Thunder and Lightning: (1938 & 1977)
 Thunder, Lightning and Sunshine (1936)
 Thunder Mountain: (1925, 1935 & 1947)
 Thunder in the Night (1935)
 Thunder Over Arizona (1956)
 Thunder Over Paris (1940)
 Thunder Over the Plains (1953)
 Thunder Over the Prairie (1941)
 Thunder Over Texas (1934)
 Thunder Pass (1954)
 Thunder in the Pines (1948)
 Thunder Riders (1928)
 Thunder River Feud (1942)
 Thunder Road: (1958, 2016 & 2018)
 Thunder Rock (1942)
 Thunder Run (1986)
 Thunder in the Sun (1959)
 Thunder Town (1946)
 Thunder Trail (1937)
 Thunder in the Valley (1947)
 Thunder Warrior (1983)
 Thunder Warrior II (1987)
 Thunder Warrior III (1988)
 Thunderball (1965)
 Thunderbird 6 (1968)
 Thunderbirds: (1952 & 2004)
 Thunderbirds Are Go (1966)
 Thunderbolt: (1910, 1929, 1947 & 1995)
 The Thunderbolt (1912)
 Thunderbolt Jack (1920)
 Thunderbolt and Lightfoot (1974)
 Thunderbolt's Tracks (1927)
 Thunderbolts of Fate (1919)
 Thundercrack! (1975)
 Thundergate (1923)
 Thundergod (1928)
 Thunderground (1989)
 Thunderhead, Son of Flicka (1945)
 Thunderheart (1992)
 Thunderhoof (1948)
 Thundering Caravans (1952)
 Thundering Dawn (1923)
 Thundering Fleas (1926)
 Thundering Frontier (1940)
 Thundering Gun Slingers (1944)
 Thundering Hoofs: (1924 & 1942)
 Thundering Jets (1958)
 Thundering Mountains (1963)
 Thundering Thompson (1929)
 Thundering Trails (1943)
 Thunderpants (2002)
 Thunderstorm (1956)
 Thunderstruck: (2004 & 2012)
 Thunichal (2010)
 Thunive Thunai (1976)
 Thuntata (2002)
 Thunveni Yamaya (1983)
 Thuppakki (2012)
 Thuppakki Munai (2018)
 Thursday (1998)
 THX 1138 (1971)
 Thy Kingdom Come (2018)
 Thy Name Is Woman (1924)
 Thy Neighbor's Wife: (1953 & 2001)
 Thy Will Be Done (2015)
 Thy Womb (2012)
 Thyaga Bhoomi (1939)
 Thyagaiah (1946)
 Thyagam (1978)
 Thyagi (1982)

Ti

 Ti ho cercata in tutti i necrologi (2013)
 Ti Oluwa Ni Ile (1993)
 Ti presento un amico (2010)
 Ti Saddhya Kay Karte (2107)

Tib-Tim

 Tibet in Song (2009)
 Tibi and His Mothers (2013)
 Tic Tac (1997)
 tick, tick... Boom! (2021)
 ...tick...tick...tick... (1970)
 Tick Tock (2018)
 Tick Tock Lullaby (2007)
 Tick Tock Tuckered (1944)
 Ticked-Off Trannies with Knives (2010)
 Ticker (2001)
 Ticket to Heaven (1981)
 Ticket to Paradise: (1936, 1961, 1962, 2011 & 2022)
 A Ticket to Tomahawk (1950)
 Tickle Me (1965)
 Ticks (1994)
 Tideland (2005)
 Tie Me Up! Tie Me Down! (1990)
 Tiempos de dictadura (2012)
 The Tied Up Balloon (1967)
 Tieta do Agreste (1996)
 Tiger: (1979, 2007, 2015, 2017 & 2018)
 The Tiger (1978)
 Tiger Bay: (1934 & 1959)
 Tiger on Beat (1988)
 The Tiger Brigades (2006)
 Tiger Cage (1988)
 Tiger Cage 2 (1990)
 Tiger Cage 3 (1991)
 Tiger Cruise (2004) (TV)
 The Tiger of Eschnapur: (1938 & 1959)
 Tiger Eyes (2013)
 The Tiger Hunter (2016)
 The Tiger Murder Case (1930)
 Tiger in the Smoke (1956)
 The Tiger and the Snow (2005)
 A Tiger Walks (1964)
 The Tiger: An Old Hunter's Tale (2015)
 Tigerland (2000)
 Tigers: (2014 & 2020)
 The Tigers (1991)
 Tigers Are Not Afraid (2017)
 Tigertail (2020)
 The Tigger Movie (2000)
 Tightrope (1984)
 Tik Tok (2016)
 Til Death (2007)
 'Til There Was You (1997)
 Tilaï (1990)
 Till (2022)
 Till the Clouds Roll By (1946)
 Till Death (2021)
 Till Human Voices Wake Us (2002)
 Till There Was You: (1990 & 2003)
 Tillamook Treasure (2006)
 Tillie's Punctured Romance (1914)
 Tilt (2017)
 Tim (1979)
 Tim and Eric's Billion Dollar Movie (2012)
 Tim Tyler's Luck (1937)
 Tim's Vermeer (2013)
 Timber Falls (2008)
 Timbuktu: (1959 & 2014)
 Time: (1999, 2006, 2007 & 2020)
 Time After Time (1979)
 Time Bandits (1981)
 A Time for Burning (1966)
 Time Changer (2002)
 A Time for Drunken Horses (2000)
 A Time for Dying (1969)
 Time of Favor (2000)
 Time Flies: (1944 & 2013)
 Time of the Gypsies (1988)
 Time to Hunt (2020)
 A Time to Kill: (1955 & 1996)
 Time to Leave (2006)
 Time Limit (1957)
 Time to Love: (1927 & 1965)
 A Time to Love and a Time to Die (1958)
 The Time Machine: (1960, 1978 TV & 2002)
 A Time for Miracles (1980) (TV)
 Time Out: (1984, 1998, 2001 & 2015)
 Time Out of Mind: (1947 & 2014)
 Time Raiders (2016)
 Time Regained (1999)
 Time Stands Still (1982)
 The Time of Their Lives (1946)
 The Time Traveler's Wife (2009)
 Time Travelers (1976)
 The Time Travelers (1964)
 Time of the Wolf: (2002 & 2003)
 Timecode (2000)
 Timecop (1994)
 Timecop 2: The Berlin Decision (2003)
 Timecrimes (2008)
 Timelapse of the Future (2019)
 Timelapse of the Entire Universe (2018)
 Timeline (2003)
 Timequest (2002)
 TiMER (2009)
 Timerider: The Adventure of Lyle Swann (1982)
 The Times of Harvey Milk (1984)
 Times of Joy and Sorrow (1957)
 Times Square: (1929 & 1980)
 Timeslip (1955)
 Timing (2014)
 Timmy Failure: Mistakes Were Made (2020)

Tin-Tiz

 Tin Can (2020)
 Tin Can Man (2007)
 Tin Cup (1996)
 The Tin Drum (1979)
 Tin Gods: (1926 & 1932)
 Tin Hats (1926)
 Tin Man (1983)
 The Tin Man (1935)
 Tin Men (1987)
 The Tin Mine (2005)
 Tin Pan Alley (1940)
 Tin Pan Alley Cats (1943)
 The Tin Star (1957)
 Tin String (2019)
 Tin Toy (1988)
 Tina (2021)
 The Tinder Box (1959)
 The Tinder Swindler (2022)
 Tine (1964)
 Tingel-Tangel (1927)
 Tingel-Tangel (1930)
 Tingeltangel (1922)
 The Tingler (1959)
 Tini: The Movie (2016)
 Tinker Bell (2008)
 Tinker Tailor Soldier Spy (2011)
 Tinker Ticker (2013)
 Tins (2007)
 Tinsel (1918)
 Tinta roja (1918)
 Tintin series:
 Tintin and I (2003)
 Tintin and the Blue Oranges (1964)
 Tintin and the Golden Fleece (1961)
 Tintin and the Lake of Sharks (1972)
 Tintin and the Temple of the Sun (1969)
 Tintomara (1970)
 Tintorettor Jishu (2008)
 Tiny Furniture (2010)
 Tiny Times series:
 Tiny Times (2013)
 Tiny Times 2 (2013)
 Tiny Times 3 (2014)
 Tiny Times 4 (2015)
 Tiny Toon Adventures: How I Spent My Vacation (1992)
 Tiong Bahru Social Club (2020)
 Tiovivo c. 1950 (2004)
 Tip on a Dead Jockey (1957)
 Tip-Off Girls (1938)
 Tiptoes (2003)
 Tirad Pass: The Last Stand of Gen. Gregorio del Pilar (1996)
 Tiragabadda Telugubidda (1988)
 Tiramisu: (2002 & 2008)
 Tirana Year Zero (2002)
 Tirant lo Blanc (2006)
 Tire Trouble (1924)
 Tired of Kissing Frogs (2006)
 Tired Theodore (1957)
 Tish (1942)
 Tit for Tat: (1904,  1921 & 1935)
 Titan A.E. (2000)
 Titane (2021)
 Titanic: (1915, 1943, 1953, & 1997)
 Titanic II (2010)
 Titanic Kadhalum Kavundhu Pogum (TBD)
 Titanic Love (2012)
 Titanic: The Legend Goes On (2000)
 Titanic Town (1998)
 Titanic Waltz (1964)
 Titanoboa: Monster Snake (2012)
 Titans of the Deep (1938)
 Titãs – A Vida Até Parece Uma Festa (2008)
 Titash Ekti Nadir Naam (1973)
 Titeuf (2011)
 The Titfield Thunderbolt (1952)
 Titicut Follies (1967)
 Title to Murder (2001)
 Title Shot (1979)
 Titli: (2002 & 2014)
 Tito: (2004 & 2019)
 Tito and the Birds (2018)
 Tito and Me (1992)
 Titus (1999)
 Tiwa's Baggage (2017)
 Tiyaan (2017)
 Tiyanak (1988)
 Tiyasha (2013)
 Tizoc (1957)

Tj–Tm

 Tjenare kungen (2005)
 Tjiraa (2012)
 Tjitji: The Himba Girl (2015)
 Tjitra (1949)
 Tjoet Nja' Dhien (1988)
 T.K.O. (2007)
 Tlatelolco, verano del 68 (2013)
 TMNT (2007)

To

 To (1964)
 To Age or Not to Age (2010)
 To All the Boys series:
 To All the Boys I've Loved Before (2018)
 To All the Boys: P.S. I Still Love You (2020)
 To All the Boys: Always and Forever (2021)
 To All a Goodnight (1980)
 To All My Friends on Shore (1972 TV)
 To Award (Posthumously) (1986)
 To B or Not to B (unreleased)
 To Be (1990)
 To Be Alive! (1964)
 To Be Called For (1914)
 To Be Continued (2018)
 To Be Fat like Me (2007 TV)
 To Be and to Have (2002)
 To Be a Lady (1934)
 To Be a Millionaire (1980)
 To Be or Not to Be: (1942 & 1983)
 To Be Number One (1991)
 To Be Sixteen (1979)
 To Be Someone (2021)
 To Be Takei (2014)
 To Be Without Worries (1953)
 To Beat the Band (1935)
 To Bed or Not to Bed (1963)
 To Beep or Not to Beep (1963)
 To Better Days (2012)
 To Bina Bhala Lagena (2008)
 To Bina Mo Kahani Adha (2007)
 To the Bone (2017)
 To Brave Alaska (1996 TV)
 To Brighton with Gladys (1933)
 To Build a Fire (2016)
 To Catch a Dollar (2010)
 To Catch a Thief (1955)
 To-Day (1917)
 To the Devil a Daughter (1976)
 To Die For: (1989, 1994 & 1995)
 The To Do List (2013)
 To Each His Own (1946)
 To End All Wars (2001)
 To the Ends of the Earth: (1948 & 2019)
 To Fly! (1976)
 To Gillian on Her 37th Birthday (1996)
 To Have and Have Not (1944)
 To Have and to Hold: (1916, 1922, 1951 & 1996)
 To Have or Not to Have (2001)
 To Hell and Back (1955)
 To the Hilt (2014)
 To Joy (1950)
 To Kill a Dragon (1988)
 To Kill a King (2003)
 To Kill a Mockingbird (1962)
 To the Last Man: (1923 & 1933)
 To Leslie (2022)
 To Live: (1937, 1952, 1994 & 2010)
 To Live and Die in L.A. (1985)
 To Live in Peace (1947)
 To Make a Killing (1988)
 To Market To Market (1987)
 To Marry a Captain (1985)
 To Mary – with Love (1936)
 To Matthieu (2000)
 To Olivia (2021)
 To Paint or Make Love (2005)
 To Rome with Love (2012)
 To Save a Life (2010)
 To Shoot an Elephant (2009)
 To Sir, with Love: (1967 & 2006)
 To Sleep with Anger (1990)
 To Spring (1936)
 To the Wonder (2013)
 To Wong Foo, Thanks for Everything! Julie Newmar (1995)
 To Write Love on Her Arms (2012)

Toa-Tol

 Toad Road (2012)
 Toad Warrior (1996)
 The Toast of New Orleans (1950)
 Toba Tek Singh (2018)
 Tobacco (1962)
 Tobacco Road (1941)
 Tobi (1978)
 Tobor the Great (1954)
 Tobruk: (1967 & 2008)
 Tocar el cielo (2007)
 Toccata for Toy Trains (1957)
 Today: (1930, 2012 & 2014)
 Today You Die (2005)
 Together: (1956, 1971, 2000, 2002, 2009, 2010, 2018 & 2021 TV)
 ToGetHer (2009)
 Together Alone (1991)
 Together? (1979)
 Togo (2019)
 Toi et moi (2006)
 Toi, le venin (1958)
 Toilers of the Sea: (1923 & 1936)
 Toilet: Ek Prem Katha (2017)
 Toire no Hanako-san (1995)
 Tokhon Kuasa Chilo (2019)
 Toki o Kakeru Shōjo: (1983 & 1997)
 Toki no Tabibito: Time Stranger (1986)
 Tokiori – Dobras do Tempo (2013)
 Tokyo! (2008)
 Tokyo After Dark (1959)
 Tokyo Blackout (1987)
 Tokyo Chorus (1931)
 Tokyo Decadence (1992)
 Tokyo Drifter (1966)
 Tokyo Emmanuelle (1975)
 Tokyo Eyes (1998)
 Tokyo Family (2013)
 Tokyo Fiancée (2014)
 Tokyo File 212 (1951)
 Tokyo Fist (1995)
 Tokyo Friends: The Movie (2006)
 Tokyo Ghoul (2017)
 Tokyo Godfathers (2003)
 Tokyo Gore Police (2008)
 Tokyo Joe (1949)
 Tōkyō Mukokuseki Shōjo (2015)
 Tokyo Olympiad (1965)
 Tokyo Raiders (2000)
 Tokyo Story (1953)
 Tokyo Tower: Mom and Me, and Sometimes Dad (2007)
 The Tokyo Trial (2006)
 Tokyo Twilight (1957)
 Tokyo: The Last Megalopolis (1988)
 Tokyo: The Last War (1989)
 Tol'able David (1921)
 Tolkien (2019)
 The Toll (2020)
 The Toll Gate (1920)
 The Toll of the Sea (1922)

Tom

 Tom (2002)
 Tom in America (2014)
 Tom Brown's School Days (1940)
 Tom Brown's Schooldays: (1916, 1951 & 2005 TV)
 Tom Clancy's Op Center (1995 TV)
 Tom, Dick and Hairy (1993)
 Tom, Dick and Harry (1941)
 Tom, Dick, and Harry (2006)
 Tom, Dick, and Harry: Rock Again... (2009)
 Tom at the Farm (2013)
 Tom of Finland (2017)
 Tom and His Pals (1926)
 Tom Horn (1980)
 Tom & Huck (1995)
 Tom and Jerry films:
 Tom and Jerry (2021)
 Tom and Jerry: Back to Oz (2016)
 Tom and Jerry: Blast Off to Mars (2005)
 Tom and Jerry: The Fast and the Furry (2005)
 Tom and Jerry: The Lost Dragon (2014)
 Tom and Jerry: The Magic Ring (2002)
 Tom and Jerry Meet Sherlock Holmes (2010)
 Tom and Jerry: The Movie (1992)
 Tom and Jerry: A Nutcracker Tale (2007)
 Tom and Jerry: Robin Hood and His Merry Mouse (2012)
 Tom and Jerry: Shiver Me Whiskers (2006)
 Tom and Jerry: Spy Quest (2015)
 Tom and Jerry: Willy Wonka and the Chocolate Factory (2017)
 Tom and Jerry and the Wizard of Oz (2011)
 Tom and Jerry's Giant Adventure (2013)
 Tom Jones (1963)
 Tom on Mars (2005)
 Tom Meets Zizou (2011)
 Tom Sawyer: (1907, 1917, 1930, 1938, 1973 & 2000)
 Tom Sawyer & Huckleberry Finn (2014)
 Tom Sawyer, Detective (1938)
 Tom & Thomas (2002)
 Tom Thumb (1958)
 Tom Thumb and Little Red Riding Hood (1962)
 Tom Tom Tomcat (1953)
 Tom, Tom, the Piper's Son (1969)
 Tom Toms of Mayumba (1955)
 Tom Turk and Daffy (1944)
 Tom & Viv (1994)
 Tom White (2004)
 Tom-Yum-Goong (2005)
 Tom Yum Goong 2 (2013)
 Tom's Gang (1927)
 Tom's Little Star (1919)
 Tom's Midnight Garden (1999)
 Tomahawk (1951)
 Tomahawk Trail (1957)
 Tomake Chai (2017)
 Toman (2018)
 Tomb of the Angels (1937)
 The Tomb of Ligeia (1964)
 Tomb of the Pistolero (1964)
 Tomb Raider (2018)
 Tomb Robber (2014)
 Tomb of the Werewolf (2004)
 Tombiruo: Penunggu Rimba (2017)
 Tomboy: (1940, 1985, 2008 & 2011)
 Tomboy and the Champ (1961)
 Tombs of the Blind Dead (1972)
 Tombstone (1993)
 Tombstone Canyon (1932)
 Tombstone Rashomon (2017)
 Tombstone Terror (1935)
 Tombstone, the Town Too Tough to Die (1942)
 Tomcat (2016)
 Tomcat Combat (1959)
 Tomcats: (1977 & 2001)
 Tome of the Unknown (2013)
 Tomfoolery (1936)
 Tomiris (2019)
 Tomka and His Friends (1977)
 Tommaso: (2016 & 2019)
 Tommy: (1931, 1975 & 2015)
 Tommy Atkins: (1915 & 1928)
 Tommy Atkins in the Park (1898)
 Tommy Boy (1995)
 Tommy Cooper: Not Like That, Like This (2014 TV)
 Tommy the Toreador (1959)
 Tommy Tricker and the Stamp Traveller (1988)
 Tommy Tucker's Tooth (1922)
 Tommy's Atonement (1913)
 Tommy's Honour (2016)
 Tomorrow: (1972, 1988 & 2001)
 Tomorrow Ever After (2017)
 Tomorrow I'll Kill Myself (1942)
 Tomorrow I'll Wake Up and Scald Myself with Tea (1977)
 Tomorrow Is Another Day: (1951 American, 1951 Italian & 2017)
 Tomorrow at Dawn (2009)
 Tomorrow Is Forever (1946)
 Tomorrow Is My Turn (1960)
 Tomorrow Is Too Late (1950)
 Tomorrow It Will Be Better (1939)
 Tomorrow La Scala! (2002)
 Tomorrow Morning (2006)
 Tomorrow My Love (1971)
 Tomorrow Never Comes (1978)
 Tomorrow Never Dies (1997)
 Tomorrow Night (1998)
 Tomorrow at Seven (1933)
 Tomorrow at Ten (1962)
 Tomorrow and Tomorrow (1932)
 The Tomorrow War (2021)
 Tomorrow Was the War (1987)
 Tomorrow We Dance (1982)
 Tomorrow We Fly (1943)
 Tomorrow We Live: (1936, 1942 & 1943)
 Tomorrow We Move (2004)
 Tomorrow, When the War Began (2012)
 Tomorrow You're Gone (2012)
 Tomorrow's Another Day: (2000 & 2011)
 Tomorrow's Children (1934)
 Tomorrow's Love (1925)
 Tomorrow's World (1943)
 Tomorrowland (2015)
 Tomte Tummetott and the Fox (2007)
 Tomy's Secret (1963)

Ton

 À ton image (2004)
 A Ton of Luck (2006)
 Tone-Deaf (2019)
 Tonelli (1943)
 The Tong Man (1919)
 Tongpan (1977)
 The Tongues of Men (1916)
 Tongues Untied (1989)
 Tongzhi in Love (2008)
 Toni (1928)
 Toni (1935)
 Toni Erdmann (2016)
 Toni Morrison: The Pieces I Am (2019)
 Tonic (2021)
 Tonio (2016)
 Tonio Kröger (1964)
 Tonight a City Will Die (1961)
 Tonight at Eleven (1938)
 Tonight and Every Night (1945)
 Tonight Is Ours (1933)
 Tonight or Never: (1931, 1941 & 1961)
 Tonight Nobody Goes Home (1996)
 Tonight for Sure (1962)
 Tonight at Twelve (1929)
 Tonight We Raid Calais (1943)
 Tonight We Sing (1953)
 Tonight We'll Dance at Home (1972)
 Tonight's the Night (1932)
 Tonite Let's All Make Love in London (1967)
 Tonka (1958)
 Tonka of the Gallows (1930)
 Tonnerre (2013)
 Tons of Money: (1924 & 1930)
 Tons of Trouble (1956)
 Tonta, tonta, pero no tanto (1972)
 The Tonto Kid (1935)
 Tony: (1982, 2009, 2013 & 2019)
 Tony: Another Double Game (1980)
 Tony Hawk in Boom Boom Sabotage (2006)
 Tony Robbins: I Am Not Your Guru (2016)
 Tony Rome (1967)
 Tony Takitani (2004)
 Tonya and Nancy: The Inside Story (1994 TV)

Too

 Too Bad She's Bad (1955)
 Too Beautiful to Lie (2004)
 Too Beautiful for You (1989)
 Too Big to Fail (2011)
 Too Busy to Work: (1932 & 1939)
 Too Close for Comfort (1990)
 Too Colourful for the League (2001 TV)
 Too Cool to Kill (2022)
 Too Dangerous to Live (1939)
 Too Early/Too Late (1981)
 Too Fat Too Furious (2005)
 Too Funny to Fail (2017)
 Too Good to Be True (1988 TV)
 Too Hard to Handle (2016)
 Too Hot to Die (2018)
 Too Hot to Handle: (1938, 1960 & 1977)
 Too Late: (1996, 2000 & 2015)
 Too Late Blues (1961)
 Too Late to Die Young (2018)
 Too Late for Love (1967)
 Too Late to Love (1959)
 Too Late the Hero (1970)
 Too Late to Say Goodbye (2009 TV) 
 Too Late for Tears (1949)
 Too Many Blondes (1941)
 Too Many Coincidences (2016)
 Too Many Cooks (1931)
 Too Many Crooks: (1927, 1930 & 1959)
 Too Many Girls (1940)
 Too Many Kisses (1925)
 Too Many Husbands (1940)
 Too Many Millions: (1918 & 1934)
 Too Many Parents (1936)
 Too Many Thieves (1967)
 Too Many Ways to Be No. 1 (1997)
 Too Many Winners (1947)
 Too Many Wives: (1933 & 1937)
 Too Many Women (1942)
 Too Much Beef (1936)
 Too Much Harmony (1933)
 Too Much Is Enough (1995)
 Too Much Johnson: (1919 & 1938)
 Too Much Money (1926)
 Too Much Pussy! (2010)
 Too Much Sex (2000)
 Too Much Speed (1921)
 Too Much Sun (1990)
 Too Much Wife (1922)
 Too Outrageous! (1987)
 Too Romantic (1992)
 Too Soon to Love (1960)
 Too Tired to Die (1998)
 Too Tough to Care (1964)
 Too Tough to Kill (1935)
 Too Wise Wives (1921)
 Too Young to Die? (1990 TV)
 Too Young to Die! Wakakushite Shinu (2016)
 Too Young the Hero (1988)
 Too Young to Kiss (1951)
 Too Young to Know (1945)
 Too Young for Love: (1953 & 1966)
 Too Young to Love (1959)
 Too Young to Marry: (1931 & 2017 TV)
 Toofaan (2021)
 Toofan: (1989 & 2002)
 Toofan Aur Bijlee (1975)
 Toofan Aur Deeya (1956)
 Toofan Singh (2017)
 Toofani Tarzan (1937)
 Tooken (2015)
 Toolbox Murders (2004)
 The Toolbox Murders (1978)
 Toomelah (2011)
 Toomorrow (1970)
 Toonpur Ka Superrhero (2010)
 Toot, Whistle, Plunk and Boom (1953)
 Tooth Fairy (2010)
 Tooth Fairy 2 (2012)
 The Tooth Fairy (2006)
 The Tooth and the Nail (2017)
 The Tooth Will Out (1951)
 Toothless (1997 TV)
 A Toothy Smile (1957)
 Toots (2006)
 Tootsie (1982)
 Tooty's Wedding (2010)

Top-Tov

 Top Banana (1954)
 Top Five (2014)
 Top Gun (1986)
 Top Gun: Maverick (2022)
 Top Hat (1935)
 Top Secret! (1984)
 Top of the World (1997)
 Topaz: (1945 & 1969)
 Topkapi (1964)
 El Topo (1970)
 Topper (1937)
 Topper Returns (1941)
 Topsy-Turvy (1999)
 Tora! Tora! Tora! (1970)
 Torch Singer (1933)
 Torch Song: (1953 & 1993 TV)
 Torch Song Trilogy (1988)
 Torment: (1924, 1944, 1950 British, 1950 Italian, 1986 & 2013)
 The Torment of Laurie Ann Cullom (2014)
 Tormented: (1960, 2009 British, 2009 Salvadorean & 2011)
 Torn Curtain (1966)
 Torque (2004)
 Torremolinos 73 (2003)
 The Torrent: (1924 & 2012)
 Torrente series:
 Torrente, el brazo tonto de la ley (1998)
 Torrente 2: Misión en Marbella (2001)
 Torrente 3: El protector (2005)
 Torrente 4: Lethal Crisis (2011)
 Tori and Lokita (2022)
 Torso (1973)
 Tortilla Flaps (1958)
 Tortilla Soup (2002)
 The Tortoise and the Hare: (1935 & 2008)
 Torture Garden (1967)
 Torture Ship (1939)
 Tosun Pasa (1976)
 Total Balalaika Show (1994)
 Total Eclipse (1995)
 Total Recall: (1990 & 2012)
 Toto the Hero (1991)
 Toto the Sheik (1950)
 Toto the Third Man (1951)
 Touch (1997)
 The Touch: (1971 & 2002)
 A Touch of Class (1973)
 Touch of Evil (1958)
 A Touch of Fever (1993)
 Touch of Pink (2004)
 A Touch of Zen (1971)
 Touchez pas au grisbi (1954)
 Touching the Void (2003)
 Tough Guys: (1960, 1986 & 2017)
 Tough Guys Don't Dance (1987)
 Tour de Force (2014)
 The Tourist: (1921, 1925 & 2010)
 Tourist Trap (1979)
 The Tournament (2009)
 Tous les Matins du Monde (1991)
 Tout Va Bien (1972)
 Tovarich (1937)

Tow-Toz

 Toward Independence (1948)
 Towards the Sun (1955)
 Toward the Unknown (1956)
 Towards Evening (1990)
 Towards Glory (1949)
 Towards the Light: (1918 & 1919)
 Towards the Sun (1955)
 Towards Zero (2007)
 Towed in a Hole (1932)
 Towelhead (2008)
 Tower: (1987, 2012 & 2016)
 Tower Bawher (2005)
 Towel Block (2012)
 Tower of Evil (1972)
 Tower of the Firstborn (1999)
 Tower Heist (2011)
 Tower House (1962)
 Tower of London: (1939 & 1962)
 Tower of Love (1974)
 Tower of Lust (1955)
 Tower to the People (2015)
 Tower of Terror: (1913, 1941 & 1997)
 The Towering Inferno (1974)
 Towers of Silence (1952)
 Towheads (2013)
 The Town: (1945 & 2010)
 Town Bus (1955)
 Town & Country (2001)
 A Town Called Panic (2009)
 Town of the Dragon (2014)
 A Town Like Alice (1956)
 Town Tamer (1965)
 The Town That Dreaded Sundown: (1976 & 2014)
 Town on Trial (1957)
 Town Without Pity (1961)
 Towncraft (2007)
 Toxic (2010)
 The Toxic Avenger series:
 The Toxic Avenger (1984)
 The Toxic Avenger Part II (1989)
 The Toxic Avenger Part III: The Last Temptation of Toxie (1989)
 Toxic Beauty (2019)
 Toxic Clouds of 9/11 (2006)
 Toxic Legacy (2006)
 Toxic Love (1983)
 Toxic Man (2018)
 Toxic Zombies (1980)
 The Toy (1982)
 Toy Love (2002)
 Toy Soldiers: (1984, 1991 & 2010)
 Toy Story series:
 Toy Story (1995)
 Toy Story 2 (1999)
 Toy Story 3 (2010)
 Toy Story 4 (2019)
 Toy Tinkers (1949)
 Toyland (2007)
 Toys (1992)
 Toys in the Attic: (1963 & 2009)
 Toz (2005)

Tr

Tra

 Trabbi Goes to Hollywood (1991)
 Trace of a Girl (1967)
 Trace of Stones (1966)
 Tracer (2016)
 Traceroute (2016)
 Tracers (2015)
 Traces of an Amorous Life (1990)
 Traces of Death (1993)
 Traces of a Dragon (2003)
 Traces of Light (1943)
 Traces of Love (2006)
 Traces of Red (1992)
 Traces of Sandalwood (2014)
 Tracey (2018)
 Track Down (2000)
 Trackdown (1976)
 Tracks (2013)
 Traffic: (2000, 2011 & 2016)
 The Traffickers (2012)
 Traffik (2018)
 Trafic: (1971 & 2004)
 Tragedy Girls (2017)
 The Tragedy of Macbeth (2021)
 Tragic Jungle (2020)
 The Trail Beyond (1934)
 The Trail of the Lonesome Pine: (1916, 1923 & 1936)
 Trailer Park Boys: The Movie (2006)
 Trailer Park of Terror (2008)
 Train (2009)
 The Train: (1964, 1970, 1973, 2007 & 2011)
 Train to Busan (2016)
 Train of Life (1998)
 Train Ride (2005)
 The Train Robbers (1973)
 Training Day (2001)
 Trainspotting (1996)
 Trainwreck (2015)
 Traitor (2008)
 The Traitor: (1936 American, 1936 German, 1957 & 2019)
 Traitor or Patriot (2000)
 Traitor's Gate (1964)
 The Traitors (1962)
 The Tramp (1915)
 The Tramp Dentists (1913)
 Trance: (2013 & 2020)
 Trance and Dance in Bali (1952)
 Trancers (1985)
 Trances (1981)
 Transamerica (2005)
 Transcendence (2014)
 Transfer: (1966 & 2010)
 The Transfiguration (2016)
Transformers film series:
 Transformers (2007)
 Transformers: Age of Extinction (2014)
 Transformers: Dark of the Moon (2011)
 Transformers: Revenge of the Fallen (2009)
 Transformers: The Last Knight (2017)
 The Transformers: The Movie (1986)
 Transit: (1980, 2005 TV, 2006, 2012, 2013 & 2018)
 Transmorphers (2007)
 Transmorphers: Fall of Man (2009)
The Transporter film series:
 The Transporter (2002)
 Transporter 2 (2005)
 Transporter 3 (2008)
 The Transporter Refueled (2015)
 Transsiberian (2008)
 Transylvania 6-5000: (1963 & 1985)
 Trap for Cinderella: (1965 & 2013)
 A Trap for Lonely Man (1990)
 A Trap for Santa Claus (1909)
 Trapeze (1956)
 Trapped: (1949 & 2002)
 Trapped in Paradise (1994)
 Tras el cristal (1986)
 Trash (1970)
 Trauma: (1962, 1993 & 2004)
 Trauma Center (2019)
 Traumschiff Surprise - Periode 1 (2004)
 Travellers and Magicians (2003)
 Travels with My Aunt (1972)

Tre

 Treachery (2013)
 Treachery on the High Seas (1936)
 Treachery Rides the Range (1936)
 Treacle Jr. (2010)
 Tread (2019)
 Tread Softly: (1952 & 1965)
 Tread Softly Stranger (1958)
 Treading Water (2001)
 Treason: (1917, 1918, 1933, 1959 & 1964)
 Treasure of the Aztecs (1921)
 Treasure Buddies (2012)
 Treasure of the Four Crowns (1983)
 Treasure Hunt: (1952, 1994 & 2003)
 Treasure Hunters (1981)
 Treasure Inn (2011)
 Treasure Island: (1918, 1920, 1934, 1938, 1950, 1971, 1972, 1973, 1982, 1985, 1988, 1990 TV, 1995 & 1999)
 Treasure of Matecumbe (1976)
 Treasure of Monte Cristo (1949)
 Treasure Planet (2002)
 Treasure Raiders (2007)
 Treasure of Ruby Hills (1955)
 Treasure of San Gennaro (1966)
 The Treasure of the Sierra Madre (1948)
 The Treatment (2001)
 A Tree Grows in Brooklyn: (1945 & 1974 TV)
 The Tree of Life (2011)
 The Tree of Might (1990)
 A Tree of Palme (2002)
 The Tree of Wooden Clogs (1978)
 Trees Lounge (1996)
 Treevenge (2008)
 Trekkies (1997)
 Trekkies 2 (2004)
 Tremble All You Want (2017)
 Tremors series:
 Tremors (1990)
 Tremors 2: Aftershocks (1996)
 Tremors 3: Back to Perfection (2001)
 Tremors 4: The Legend Begins (2004)
 Tremors 5: Bloodlines (2015)
 Tremors: A Cold Day in Hell (2018)
 Tremors: Shrieker Island (2020)
 Trench 11 (2017)
 Trenchcoat (1983)
 Trenchcoat in Paradise (1989 TV)
 Trenck (1932)
 Tres muchachas de Jalisco (1964)
 Tres mujeres en la hoguera (1976)
 Trespass: (1992 & 2011)
 Trespass Against Us (2016)
 The Trespasser: (1929 & 1947)
 Tressette: A Story of an Island (2006)
 Trevor (1994)

Tri

 The Trial: (1948, 1962, 1993, 2006, 2009, 2010 & 2014)
 The Trial of Billy Jack (1974)
 Trial by Fire (2018)
 The Trial of the Chicago 7 (2020)
 Trial and Error (1997)
 The Trial of Joan of Arc (1962)
 The Trials of Oscar Wilde (1960)
 Triangle: (2007, 2009 British & 2009 South Korean)
 The Triangle (2001) (TV)
 Triangle of Sadness (2022)
 The Tribe: (1998 TV, 2005, 2014 & 2018)
 Tribes (1970) (TV)
 The Tribes of Palos Verdes (2017)
 Tribhanga (2021)
 Tribute: (1980 & 2009)
 Trick: (1999 & 2019)
 Trick Baby (1972)
 Trick or Treat: (1952, 1986 & unreleased)
 Trick 'r Treat (2007)
 Tricks: (1925 & 2007)
 Tricky Brains (1990)
 The Tricky Master (1999)
 The Trigger Effect (1996)
 Trigun: Badlands Rumble (2010)
 Trilogy of Terror (1975) (TV)
 Trilogy of Terror II (1996) (TV)
 Trinity: (2003 & 2016)
 Trinity Rides Again (1969)
 Trinity Is Still My Name (1971)
 Trip (2021)
 The Trip: (1967, 2002 & 2010)
 The Trip to Bountiful (1985)
 The Trip to Greece (2020)
 The Trip to Italy (2014)
 A Trip to the Moon (1902)
 The Trip to Spain (2017)
 Tripfall (2000)
 The Triple Echo (1972)
 Triple Threat: (1948 & 2019)
 Triple Trouble: (1918 & 1950)
 The Triplets of Belleville (2003)
 Triplex (1991)
 Trishna: (1978, 2009 & 2011)
 Tristan & Isolde (2006)
 Tristana (1970)
 Tristram Shandy: A Cock and Bull Story (2006)
 The Triumph of Love: (1922 & 2001)
 Triumph of the Nerds (1996) (TV)
 Triumph of the Son of Hercules (1961)
 Triumph of the Spirit (1989)
 The Triumph of the Weak (1918)
 Triumph of the Will (1935)
 Triumphs of a Man Called Horse (1983)
 Trixie (2000)

Tro-Try

 Trog (1970)
 Trois hommes et un couffin (1985)
 The Trojan Horse (1961)
 Trojan War (1997)
 Trojan Warrior (2002)
 The Trojan Women (1971)
 Troll: (1986 & 2022)
 Troll 2 (1990)
 A Troll in Central Park (1994)
 The Troll Hunter (2010)
 The Trollenberg Terror (1958)
 Trolley Troubles (1927)
 Trollhunters: Rise of the Titans (2021)
Trolls (2016)
 Trolls World Tour (2020)
 Tromeo and Juliet (1996)
 Tron (1982)
 Tron: Legacy (2010)
 Troop Beverly Hills (1989)
 Troops (1997)
 Trop belle pour toi (1989)
 Tropic of Ice (1987)
 Tropic Thunder (2008)
 Tropical Malady (2004)
 Le Trou (1960)
 The Trouble with Angels (1966)
 Trouble Backstairs: (1935 & 1949)
 Trouble with the Curve (2012)
 Trouble Every Day (2001)
 The Trouble with Girls (1969)
 The Trouble with Harry (1955)
 Trouble Makers: (1948 & 2006)
 Trouble Man (1972)
 The Trouble with Men and Women (2003)
 Trouble in Paradise (1932)
 Troubled Laughter (1979)
 Troy (2004)
 Tru Confessions (2002) (TV)
 The Truants (1922)
 The Truce (1997)
 Truck Turner (1974)
 Trucks (1997) (TV)
 Trudell (2005)
 The True Adventures of Wolfboy (2019)
 True Believer (1989)
 True Confessions (1981)
 True Crime: (1996 & 1999)
 True Grit: (1969 & 2010)
 True Heart Susie (1919)
 True History of the Kelly Gang (2019)
 True Lies (1994)
 True Love: (1989 & 2012)
 True Memoirs of an International Assassin (2016)
 True Romance (1993)
 True Stories (1986)
 True Story (2015)
 The True Story of Ah Q (1981)
 The True Story of the Civil War (1956)
 The True Story of Jesse James (1957)
 True Things (2021)
 The Truffle Hunters (2020)
 Truly, Madly, Deeply (1990)
 The Truman Show (1998)
 Trumbo: (2007 & 2015)
 Trump Card: (2009 & 2020)
 The Trump Prophecy (2018)
 Trump: The Kremlin Candidate? (2017) (TV)
 Trump: What's the Deal? (1991)
 Trumped: (2009 & 2017)
 The Trumpet of the Swan (2001)
 Trunk to Cairo (1966)
 Trust: (1976, 1990, 1999 TV, 2010 & 2021)
 The Trust: (1915, 1993 & 2016)
 Trust the Man (2006)
 Trust Me: (1989, 2007, 2010 & 2013)
 Trusting Is Good... Shooting Is Better (1968)
 The Truth: (1960, 1988, 1998, 2006 & 2019)
 The Truth About Cats & Dogs (1996)
 The Truth About Charlie (2002)
 The Truth About Love (2004)
 The Truth About Mother Goose (1957)
 Truth or Consequences, N.M. (1997)
 Truth or Dare (2018)
 Truth or Dare (1991)
 Truth in Numbers? (2010)
 Try and Get It (1924)
 Try Not to Breathe (2006)
 Try to Remember (2004)
 Try This One for Size (1989)

Ts-Tt

 Tsar (2009)
 Tsar Ivan the Terrible (1991)
 Tsar to Lenin (1937)
 Tsarevich Alexei (1997)
 Tsarevich Prosha (1974)
 Tsatsiki, morsan och polisen (1999)
 Tsatsiki – vänner för alltid (2001) 
 Tsotsi (2005)
 Tsubasa no gaika (1942)
 Tsubasa Reservoir Chronicle the Movie: The Princess in the Birdcage Kingdom (2005)
 Tsuchi (1939)
 Tsugaru Folk Song (1973)
 Tsukue no Nakami (2007)
 Tsukuroi Tatsu Hito (2015)
 Tsunami (2020)
 Tsure ga Utsu ni Narimashite (2011)
 TT3D: Closer to the Edge (2011)

Tu

 Tu as crié: Let me go (1997)
 Tu Hai Mera Sunday (2017)
 Tu Hi Re (2015)
 Tu ten kámen (1923)
 Tu Maza Jeev (2009)
 Tu Mera 22 Main Tera 22 (2013)
 Tu mi turbi (1983)
 Tu Mo Hero (2017)
 Tu Mo Love Story (2017)
 Tu Nahin Aur Sahi (1960)
 Tu ne tueras point (1961)
 Tu Tithe Mee (1998)

Tua-Tuy

 Tuareg – The Desert Warrior (1984)
 Tub Girls (1967)
 Tuba Atlantic (2010)
 A Tuba to Cuba (2018)
 Tubby the Tuba: (1947 & 1975)
 Tube (2003)
 Tube Tales (1999)
 Tubelight: (2017 Hindi & 2017 Tamil)
 Tuck Everlasting: (1981 & 2002)
 Tucker & Dale vs. Evil (2010)
 Tucker: The Man and His Dream (1988)
 Tucson (1949)
 Tudo Bem (1978)
 Tudor Rose (1936)
 Tuesday: (2008 & TBD)
 Tuesday, After Christmas (2010)
 Tuesday in November (1945)
 Tuesday's Guest (1950)
 Tuesdays with Morrie (1999)
 Tuff Turf (1985)
 Tug of War (2006 & 2021)
 Tugboat Annie (1933)
 Tugboat Annie Sails Again (1940)
 Tugboat Granny (1956)
 Tugboat M 17 (1933)
 Tugboat Princess (1936)
 Tui Amar Rani (2019)
 Tujhe Meri Kasam (2003)
 Tujhe Nahin Chhodunga (1989)
 Tujhse He Raabta (2015 TV)
 Tukaram (2012)
 Tula: The Revolt (2013)
 Tula Kalnnaar Nahi (2017)
 Tulad ng Dati (2006)
 Tulips Shall Grow (1942)
 Tulip Fever (2017)
 Tully (2018)
 Tulsa (1949)
 The Tulsa Kid (1940)
 Tumbbad (2018)
 Tumbleweeds: (1925 & 1999)
 Tumko Na Bhool Paayenge (2002)
 The Tune (1992)
 The Tuner (2004)
 Tunes of Glory (1960)
 The Tunnel: (1915, 1933 French-language, 1933 German-language, 1935, 1962, 2001, 2009, 2011, 2014 & 2019)
 The Tunnel of Love (1958)
 The Tunnel Under the World (1969)
 Tunnel Vision: (1976 & 1995)
 Tupac: Resurrection (2003)
 Turbo (2013)
 Turbo Kid (2015)
 Turbo: A Power Rangers Movie (1997)
 Turbo Time (1983)
 Turbulence: (2000 & 2011)
 Turbulence series:
 Turbulence (1997)
 Turbulence 2: Fear of Flying (1999)
 Turbulence 3: Heavy Metal (2001)
 A Turf Conspiracy (1918)
 The Turin Horse (2011)
 Turistas (2006)
 Turk 182 (1985)
 The Turkey (1951)
 The Turkey Bowl (2019)
 Turkey Hollow (2015)
 Turkey Shoot: (1982 & 2014)
 Turkey Time: (1933 & 1970 TV)
 The Turkish Cucumbers (1962)
 Turkish Delight: (1927 & 1973)
 The Turkish Gambit (2005)
 The Turkish Passion (1994)
 Turkish Passport (2011)
 Turks & Caicos (2014 TV)
 Turksib (1929)
 The Turmoil: (1916 & 1924)
 The Turn (2012)
 The Turn of a Card (1918)
 A Turn of the Cards (1914)
 The Turn of the Century (2001)
 Turn It Up (2000)
 Turn Left, Turn Right (2003)
 Turn Me On, Dammit! (2011)
 The Turn in the Road (1919)
 The Turn of the Screw: (1974 & 2009)
 The Turn of the Wheel (1918)
 Turner & Hooch (1989)
 The Turners of Prospect Road (1947)
 The Turning: (1992, 2013 & 2020)
 The Turning Point: (1920, 1945, 1952, 1952, 1977, 1978 & 1983)
 Turning Red (2022)
 Turok: Son of Stone (2008)
 Turtle Beach (1992)
 A Turtle's Tale: Sammy's Adventures (2010)
 A Turtle's Tale 2: Sammy's Escape from Paradise (2012)
 Turtles Can Fly (2004)
 Turtles Forever (2009) (TV)
 Tuscaloosa (2019)
 Tuscan Wedding (2014)
 Tusk: (1980 & 2014)
 The Tuskegee Airmen (1995 TV)
 Tutta colpa di Freud (2014)
 Tutta la città canta (1945)
 Tutti defunti... tranne i morti (1977)
 The Tuttles of Tahiti (1942)
 Tutto il mondo ride (1952)
 Tutto l'amore che c'è (2000)
 Tutto molto bello (2014)
 Tutto tutto niente niente (2012)
 Tuvalu (1999)
 The Tuxedo (2002)
 Tuxedo Junction (1941)
 Tuya en cuerpo y alma (1944)
 Tuya's Marriage (2006)

Tv-Ty

 The TV Set (2006)
 Tweek City (2005)
 Tween Academy: Class of 2012 (2011)
 Tweet and Lovely (1959)
 Tweet and Sour (1956)
 Tweet Tweet Tweety (1951)
 Tweet Zoo (1957)
 Tweet's Ladies of Pasadena (1970)
 Tweetie Pie (1947)
 Tweety and the Beanstalk (1957)
 Tweety's Circus (1955)
 Tweety's High-Flying Adventure (2000)
 Tweety's S.O.S. (1951)
 The Twelfth Juror (1913)
 Twelfth Night: (1910, 1933, 1955, 1966 TV, 1970 TV, 1980, 1986 & 1996)
 Twelve (2010)
 The Twelve Chairs: (1970, 1971 & 1976)
 Twelve Disciples of Nelson Mandela (2005)
 Twelve Monkeys (1995)
 The Twelve Months: (1956 & 1972)
 Twelve Months (1980)
 Twelve O'Clock High (1949)
 The Twelve Tasks of Asterix (1976)
 Twentieth Century (1934)
 The Twentieth Century (2019)
 Twenty Bucks (1993)
 Twenty Four Seven (1997)
 Twenty Minutes of Love (1914)
 Twenty-Four Eyes (1954)
 Twentynine Palms (2003)
 Twice Round the Daffodils (1962)
 Twice Upon a Time: (1953 & 1983)
 Twice Upon a Yesterday (1998)
 Twice-Told Tales (1963)
 Twilight (1998)
 Twilight of Honor (1963)
 Twilight of the Ice Nymphs (1997)
 Twilight Online (2014)
 The Twilight Saga series:
 Twilight (2008)
 The Twilight Saga: New Moon (2009)
 The Twilight Saga: Eclipse (2010)
 The Twilight Saga: Breaking Dawn – Part 1 (2011)
 The Twilight Saga: Breaking Dawn – Part 2 (2012)
 The Twilight Samurai (2002)
 Twilight Syndrome: Dead Go Round (2008)
 Twilight Zone: The Movie (1983)
 Twilight's Last Gleaming (1977)
 Twin Dragons (1992)
 Twin Falls Idaho (1999)
 Twin Peaks: Fire Walk with Me (1992)
 Twin Sisters: (1934 & 2002)
 Twin Town (1997)
 Twinkle, Twinkle Lucky Stars (1995)
 Twins: (1925 & 1988)
 The Twins: (1923 & 2005)
 The Twins Effect (2003)
 The Twins Effect II (2004)
 Twins of Evil (1971)
 Twist (2003)
 The Twist (1976)
 Twisted: (1986, 1996 & 2004)
 Twisted Desire (1996) (TV)
 Twisted House Sitter (2021)
 Twisted Justice (2016)
 Twisted Nerve (1968)
 Twisted Obsession (1990)
 Twisted Pair (2018)
 Twister: (1989 & 1996)
 Twitch of the Death Nerve (1971)
 Twixt (2011)
 Two Against the World: (1932 & 1936)
 Two Arabian Knights (1927)
 Two Brothers: (1929 & 2004)
 The Two Brothers (1910)
 Two Can Play That Game (2001)
 Two Distant Strangers (2020)
 Two in a Car (1932)
 Two Cops (1993)
 Two Days, One Night (2014)
 Two Daughters (1961)
 Two English Girls (1971)
 Two Evil Eyes (1990)
 The Two Faces of Dr. Jekyll (1960)
 Two Girls and a Guy (1997)
 Two Great Sheep (2004)
 Two on a Guillotine (1965)
 Two Hands (1999)
 Two Hands: The Leon Fleisher Story (2006)
 Two If by Sea (1996)
 The Two Jakes (1974)
 Two of a Kind: (1951 & 1983)
 Two Knights from Brooklyn (1949)
 The Two Lives of Mattia Pascal (1985)
 Two Lottery Tickets (2016)
 Two Lovers: (1928 & 2008)
 Two Lovers and a Bear (2016)
 Two Men in Town: (1973 & 2014)
 Two Men and a Wardrobe (1958)
 Two for the Money (2005)
 Two Moon Junction (1988)
 The Two Mrs. Carrolls (1947)
 Two Much (1995)
 Two Mules for Sister Sara (1970)
 Two Night Stand (2014)
 Two Plus Fours (1930)
 The Two Popes (2019)
 Two for the Road (1967)
 Two Rode Together (1961)
 Two for the Seesaw (1962)
 Two Solitudes (1978)
 Two Stage Sisters (1964)
 Two Tars (1928)
 Two Thousand Maniacs! (1964)
 Two or Three Things I Know About Her (1967)
 Two of Us: (1987 TV, 2000 TV & 2019)
 The Two of Us: (1967 & 2014)
 Two on a Vacation (1940)
 Two Weeks: (1920 & 2006)
 Two Weeks Notice (2002)
 Two Women: (1960, 1947 & 1999)
 The Two Worlds of Jennie Logan (1979) (TV)
 Two-Fisted Tales (1992) (TV)
 Two-Lane Blacktop (1971)
 Two-Minute Warning (1976)
 Two-Way Stretch (1960)
 The Twonky (1953)
 TxT (2006)
 Tyagayya (1981)
 Tyagg: (1977 & 2004)
 Tyagi (1992)
 Tycoon: (1947 & 2002)
 Tyger Tyger (2021)
 Tyler (1978 TV)
 Typeface (2009)
 Typhoon: (1933, 1940 & 2005)
 The Typhoon (1914)
 Typhoon Noruda (2015)
 The Typist (1931)
 The Typist Gets Married (1934)
 Tyrannosaur (2011)
 The Tyrant Father (1941)
 The Tyrant of Padua (1946)
 The Tyrant's Heart (1981)
 Tyrel (2018)
 Tyrus (2015)
 Tyson: (1995 & 2008)

Previous:  List of films: S    Next:  List of films: U–W

See also
 Lists of films
 Lists of actors
 List of film and television directors
 List of documentary films
 List of film production companies

-